Arnold Schwarzenegger is an Austrian-American actor who has appeared in multiple film roles. Throughout his career, Schwarzenegger has been nominated for and won various awards including a Golden Globe Award, several Nickelodeon Kids' Choice Awards, and a MTV Movie Award. 

This list is of his acting awards; for his awards in bodybuilding, see Arnold Schwarzenegger's bodybuilding career. And for other honors given to him, see Awards and honors section.

Awards and nominations

Other awards

See also
Arnold Schwarzenegger filmography

References

External links

Awards
Lists of awards received by American actor